HNLMS Abraham van der Hulst was a  built for the Royal Netherlands Navy in the 1930s. The German invasion of the Netherlands resulted in the ship being scuttled at Enkhuizen on 14 May 1940, but was raised by the Germans and entered service as the minesweeper M 553 with Nazi Germany's Kriegsmarine. The vessel was sunk by a mine off East Prussia on 21 April 1944. M 552 was raised on 20 July 1944 and towed to Stettin. There, the ship was bombed and burned out 20 August 1944. The wreck was captured by the Soviets. One source says she was returned to the Netherlands post war.

References

Bibliography
 Gardiner, Robert and Roger Chesneau. Conway's All The World's Fighting Warships 1922–1946. London: Conway Maritime Press, 1980. . 
 Lenton, H.T. German Warships of the Second World War. London: Macdonald and Jane's, 1975. .

External links

 

Jan van Amstel-class minesweepers
1937 ships
World War II minesweepers of the Netherlands
Mine warfare vessels of the Kriegsmarine
Naval ships of the Netherlands captured by Germany during World War II
World War II shipwrecks in the Baltic Sea
Maritime incidents in May 1940
Maritime incidents in April 1944
Maritime incidents in August 1944
Ships sunk by mines
Ships built by Gusto Shipyard